Airoran is a language of Indonesia, spoken in the north coast area on the lower Apauwer River of Papua (Irian Jaya), in the villages of Subu, Motobiak, Isirania, etc. It is rather divergent from other Kwerba languages, though clearly related.

References

Clouse, Duane, Mark Donohue and Felix Ma. 2002. "Survey report of the north coast of Irian Jaya."
OLAC resources in and about the Airoran language

Languages of western New Guinea
Kwerbic languages